Gahnia ancistrophylla, also known as hooked-leaf saw sedge, is a tussock-forming perennial in the family Cyperaceae, that is native to southern parts of Western Australia, South Australia and Victoria.

References

ancistrophylla
Plants described in 1878
Flora of Western Australia
Flora of South Australia
Flora of Victoria (Australia)
Taxa named by George Bentham